Joachim Johannes Ferreira (8 August 1835 – 16 May 1917) was a Boer commandant of the First Boer War.

Life 
Ferreira was born near Uitenhage and was taken on the Great Trek as an infant. He married Adriana Davel and had a daughter. He settled near Swaziland with other Voortrekker families in what they called the Commonwealth of the Klein Vrystaat in 1875. At the same time, Swazi King Mbandzeni granted a 36,000-acre grazing concession to Ferreira and his brother-in-law, Franz Ignatius Maritz, the largest concession to Boer settlers at the time.

Ferreira began the First Boer War as the commandant of the Utrecht commando, and went on to lead one of the two Boer divisions at the Battle of Majuba Hill on 27 February 1881. He was responsible for negotiating the transfer of land east of the Lebombo Mountains to the South African Republic. His plans were frustrated by the actions of Sir Charles Saunders who annexed the territory which became known as British Maputaland.

He died near Piet Retief, on 16 May 1917.

Footnotes

Bibliography 
 
 
 

1835 births
1917 deaths
Afrikaner people
Boer generals
People from Uitenhage
People of the First Boer War